Frank Ellis Boynton (July 10, 1859 – December 10, 1942) was a self-taught American botanist active in the Southeastern United States.  He worked at Biltmore Estate with his brother, Charles Lawrence Boynton, and Chauncey Beadle. Boynton's dewberry, Rubus boyntonii was named in honor of Frank Ellis Boynton.

References

Sources 
 
 

1859 births
1942 deaths
American botanists
People from Hyde Park, Vermont